Blackberry Castle is a private residence resembling a castle, located  in Portland, Oregon, in the United States. Construction of the 13,000-square-foot, French-style house took three years, and was completed in 2015. Features include a ceiling fresco, climbing wall, indoor theater, and the largest ceiling clock dial in Oregon, which is installed above a two-story library.

The property was put on the market for $7,175,000 in March 2015. Mia Malkova, an adult-film actress, and Eli Tucker, a content producer, along with a silent partner, paid $3.9 million to make the gated and guarded estate a home film studio. According to public records, the new owners closed the deal December 18, 2020, and took possession of the castle on January 9, 2021.

See also

 Canterbury Castle (Portland, Oregon)

References

External links 
 

2015 establishments in Oregon
Buildings and structures completed in 2015
Houses in Portland, Oregon
Northwest Portland, Oregon